Scythris valgella is a moth of the family Scythrididae. It was described by Bengt Å. Bengtsson in 2002. It is found in Iran, the United Arab Emirates, Yemen and Oman.

Etymology
The species name refers to the curved valvae and is derived from Latin valgus (meaning bow-legged, cow-hocked).

References

valgella
Moths described in 2002